František Knebort (born 19 January 1944) is a Czech former football player who competed in the 1964 Summer Olympics.

References

External links
 
 
 

1944 births
Living people
Czech footballers
Czechoslovak footballers
Czechoslovakia international footballers
Olympic footballers of Czechoslovakia
Olympic silver medalists for Czechoslovakia
Olympic medalists in football
Footballers at the 1964 Summer Olympics
Medalists at the 1964 Summer Olympics
Footballers from Prague
SK Slavia Prague players
FK Teplice players
Bohemians 1905 players
Dukla Prague footballers
Association football forwards